Andy Furtado Dixon (born 3 January 1980) is a Costa Rican footballer who currently plays for Belén.

Club career
He lost the Second Division championship final in May 2005 with Fusión Tibás.
In August 2008 Furtado signed a 4-month contract with Chinese side Shanghai Shenhua.

He played in the CONCACAF's Champions League 2008-09, with Marathón of Honduras. In January 2009 he moved to Herediano on loan. After returning to Marathón, Furtado was banned from football by the Costa Rica football federation in September 2009, after being tested positive for betamethasone. In May 2011 he resumed playing when he was snapped up by Guatemalan outfit Comunicaciones.

In January 2012, he returned to Costa Rica to play for Limón and in Summer 2012, he joined Belén. In summer 2013 he left Belén but was denied by Santos due to physical problems.

International career
Furtado made his debut for Costa Rica in a February 2007 friendly match against Trinidad & Tobago and earned a total of 9 caps, scoring 5 goals. He represented his country in 2 FIFA World Cup qualification matches and played at the 2007 and 2009 UNCAF Nations Cup, where he scored the 2 winning goals over Panama on the 6' and 15' minute, which made Costa Rica win 3-0.

His final international was an April 2009 FIFA World Cup qualification match against El Salvador.

References

External links

1980 births
Living people
People from Limón Province
Association football forwards
Costa Rican footballers
Costa Rica international footballers
Santos de Guápiles footballers
A.D. San Carlos footballers
C.D. Marathón players
C.S. Herediano footballers
Shanghai Shenhua F.C. players
Comunicaciones F.C. players
Belén F.C. players
Costa Rican expatriate footballers
Expatriate footballers in Honduras
Expatriate footballers in China
Expatriate footballers in Guatemala
Liga FPD players
Liga Nacional de Fútbol Profesional de Honduras players
Doping cases in association football
2007 UNCAF Nations Cup players
2009 UNCAF Nations Cup players
Copa Centroamericana-winning players